Roger de Rowell (also Rodwell or Rodewell) was an English medieval university chancellor.

During 1283–4, Roger de Rowell was Chancellor of the University of Oxford. At the end of time as Chancellor, there was a controversy between the University and the Bishop of Lincoln, Oliver Sutton.

References

Year of birth unknown
Year of death unknown
Chancellors of the University of Oxford
13th-century English people